The Devon Wildlife Trust is a member of The Wildlife Trusts partnership covering the county of Devon, England. It is a registered charity, established in 1962 as the Devon Naturalists Trust, and its aim is to safeguard the future of the county's urban, rural and marine wildlife and its environment.

The trust
Twenty percent of Devon is unspoilt wildlife habitat, and the county contains all or part of two national parks (Dartmoor and Exmoor), one UNESCO biosphere reserve (North Devon Biosphere Reserve), five Areas of Outstanding Natural Beauty (Blackdown Hills, East Devon, North Devon Coast, South Devon and the Tamar Valley) and part of the Jurassic Coast, the only natural World Heritage Site in England. Devon Wildlife Trust campaigns on a number of regional and national wildlife issues, and also looks after some 58 nature reserves including Sites of Special Scientific Interest such as Bystock, Dawlish Warren, Bovey Heath, Chudleigh Knighton Heath, and Dunsford.

The trust has about 37,000 members which help fund its work and it is aided by around 300 volunteers which help with running local groups and habitat management work on the charity's nature reserves. There are also some 100 full-time staff working for the Trust.

The Trust's headquarters and visitor centre is located at the historic Cricklepit Mill in Exeter. The building features a working 19th-century water-powered flour mill and displays information about the Trust's reserves and activities. Outside is a wildlife garden, an oasis of calm in the middle of the city. The Trust's other visitor centre is Wembury Marine Centre on the coast in Wembury.  The trust also manages Woodah Farm, near Doddiscombsleigh, which is situated in a wildlife reserve and provides groups with research facilities.

Nature reserves
Devon Wildlife Trust manages the following nature reserves:

 Andrew's Wood
 Ash Moor
 Ashculm Turbary
 Barley Valley Park
 Bellever Moor and Meadows
 Blackadon
 Bovey Heathfield
 Bystock Pools
 Chudleigh Knighton Heath
 Clayhidon Turbary
 Dart Valley
 Dawlish Inner Warren
 Dunsdon
 Dunsford
 Duryard and Belvidere Valley Park
 Emsworthy Mire
 Exe Reed Beds
 Exeter Valley Parks
 Halsdon
 Halwill Junction
 Hawkwood
 Higher Kiln Quarry
 Horsey Island
 Ideford Common
 Lady's Wood
 Lickham Common
 Little Bradley Ponds
 Lower East Lounston
 Ludwell Valley Park
 Mambury Moor
 Marsland
 Meeth Quarry
 Meresfelle
 Meshaw Moor
 Mill Bottom
 Mincinglake Valley Park
 New England Wood
 Old Sludge Beds, Exe Estuary
 Rackenford and Knowstone Moors
 Riverside Valley Park
 Ruggadon Middlepark
 Scanniclift Copse
 Sourton Quarry
 South Efford Marsh
 Stapleton Mire
 Stowford Moor
 Swanpool Marsh
 Teigngrace Meadow
 The Rough
 Uppacott Wood
 Vealand Farm
 Veilstone Moore
 Venn Ottery
 Volehouse Moor
 Warleigh Point
 Whitycombe Valley Park
 Wolborough Fen
 Woodah Farm Rural Skills Centre

Campaigns
Devon Wildlife Trust actively promotes and runs a number of campaigns. Devon is the only English county with two coastlines, and the Devon Wildlife Trust is joining with other wildlife trusts to campaign for better protection of marine life.

The Trust are responsible for watching over the UK's only breeding population of wild beavers. Present since at least 2008 in the River Otter, evidence of kits was found in 2014 and there were later believed to be eight families living on the river.

References

External links
 Wembury Marine Centre website

Environment of Devon
Organisations based in Devon
Wildlife Trusts of England
1962 establishments in England
 
Organizations established in 1962